Dropped from Heaven (French: Tombé du ciel) is a 1946 French comedy film directed by Emil E. Reinert and starring Jacqueline Gauthier, Claude Dauphin and Giselle Pascal. A singer jokingly tells one of her bandmates that he is the father of her child, who is really not her daughter at all but belongs to a friend.

Cast
 Jacqueline Gauthier as Gaby 
 Claude Dauphin as Maurice 
 Giselle Pascal as Madeleine 
 Albert Broquin 
 Jean Carmet 
 Henri de Livry 
 Pierre Destailles as Fernand 
 Mona Dol 
 Charlotte Ecard 
 Jean Gabert 
 Jean Gaven as Robert  
 Renaud Mary as Raymond  
 Geneviève Morel  
 Félix Oudart as Léon 
 Sinoël
 Roger Vincent   
 Jeanne Véniat

Production
Guy Lefranc was assistant director on the movie.

References

Bibliography 
 Rège, Philippe. Encyclopedia of French Film Directors, Volume 1. Scarecrow Press, 2009.

External links 
 

1946 films
1946 comedy films
French comedy films
1940s French-language films
Films directed by Emil-Edwin Reinert
French black-and-white films
1940s French films